Harland Hand Memorial Garden is half an acre (one fifth hectare) botanical garden built on a hillside of the El Cerrito Hills in El Cerrito, California.  The garden is known for its dramatic color combinations and panoramic view over San Francisco Bay. There is a website devoted to the garden and to writings related to Harland Hand: 
https://harlandhandgarden.com/

Overview
The garden is in private hands but opens several days a year to groups by prior arrangement. It uses concrete across many levels to mimic the gray granite glacial washes of the High Sierra's Silver Lake. Its planting is varied, with succulents and more temperate plants, trees, and shrubs, while it also hosts a population of Pacific tree frogs.

The late Harland Hand was a school teacher but was also a plantsman and garden designer. He was president of the California Horticultural Society, a co-founder of Pacific Horticulture, and a board member of the University of California Botanical Garden.

See also
 List of botanical gardens in the United States

References

Harland Hand Memorial Garden Website

Harland Hand made the most of a hillside with a view

Gardens in California
History of Contra Costa County, California
Protected areas of Contra Costa County, California
El Cerrito, California